The 2nd Battalion, 80th Field Artillery was constituted on 1 July 1916 in the Regular Army as Troops C and D, 22nd Cavalry.  It was reorganized on 21 June 1917 at Fort Oglethorpe, Georgia and then consolidated, converted, and redesignated on 1 November 1917 as Battery B, 80th Field Artillery.  On 10 September 1921, it was inactivated at Camp George G. Meade, Maryland.  On 12 October 1939, it was activated at Fort Lewis, Washington.  On 1 October 1940, the 2-80 FA was reorganized and redesignated as Battery B, 80th Field Artillery Battalion.  On 20 July 1947, it was inactivated in Korea.  It was reactivated on 4 October 1950 at Fort Ord, California, where it was later inactivated on 3 April 1956.  On 2 June 1958, 2-80 FA was redesignated as Headquarters and Headquarters Battery, 2nd Missile Battalion, 80th Field Artillery.  The battalion activated 25 June 1958 at Fort Sill, Oklahoma, where it later inactivated on 25 March 1963.  On September 1971, it was redesignated as the 2nd Missile Battalion, 80th Field Artillery.  On 28 February 1987, the 2-80 FA was reorganized and activated as the 2nd Battalion, 80th Field Artillery, consisting of three Basic Training and two Advanced Individual Training Batteries.  Later it was reorganized to consist of four Army and one Marine Field Artillery Advanced Individual Training batteries.

The dual character of the regiment is shown by the colors of the field, yellow for cavalry, red for artillery.  World War I service is indicated by the fess which is based on the arms of ancient Brittany and the arms of Vannes where the unit served.  The Canton refers to the coat of army of the 11th Cavalry, from which the men were transferred to form the 22nd Cavalry, predecessor of the present regiment.  The boar's head, from the arms of the Oglethorpe family, closely identified with Georgia, the state in which the unit was organized is an ancient symbol of hospitality.

Training accident
Eighty soldiers of Alpha battery of the 2nd Battalion 80th Field Artillery Regiment were standing in formation on September 27, 1989,  when one or more shells apparently over-shot the intended target, landing among them. Three were killed and 24 were injured. Two soldiers were charged, with negligent homicide and dereliction of duty,  but were cleared as criminal intent was not involved.

References

080 2